Joseph Albert Gilles Dubé (June 2, 1927 – September 29, 2016) was a Canadian professional ice hockey forward who played 12 regular season games in the National Hockey League for the Montreal Canadiens during the 1949–50 season and 2 playoff games with the Detroit Red Wings in the 1954 Stanley Cup playoffs. With Detroit he won the Stanley Cup that year. The rest of his career, which lasted from 1948 to 1962, was spent in the minor leagues.

Dubé also played professional baseball as an outfielder, first with the Sherbrooke Canadians in 1946, then with the Sherbrooke Athletics and 1948 and 1949.

Career statistics

Regular season and playoffs

References

External links
 
 

1927 births
2016 deaths
Baseball outfielders
Canadian expatriate ice hockey players in the United States
Canadian ice hockey forwards
Cincinnati Mohawks (AHL) players
Detroit Red Wings players
French Quebecers
Ice hockey people from Quebec
Minor league baseball players
Montreal Canadiens players
Shawinigan-Falls Cataracts (QSHL) players
Sherbrooke Athletics players
Sherbrooke Canadians players
Sherbrooke Saint-François players
Sherbrooke Saints players
Sportspeople from Sherbrooke
Stanley Cup champions